The Tenleytown–Glover Park Line, designated Route N8, was a bus route operated by the Washington Metropolitan Area Transit Authority between Tenleytown–AU station of the Red Line of the Washington Metro and Glover Park. The line operated every 20–40 minutes on weekdays only with trips roughly taking 30 minutes. The route was discontinued on September 23, 2011 due to low ridership.

History
Route N8 originally operated between Friendship Heights station and Glen Echo Park which replaced route C1. However, the route was discontinued in the 1990s and replaced by Ride On route 29 which operates on the same routing as route N8 but is extended to Bethesda station.

The line was reincarnated as the Van Ness–Wesley Heights Line in 1999 to operate daily service between Van Ness–UDC station and Wesley Heights conjunction with the District of Columbia Small Bus Program. This was to eliminate the use of larger buses along Yuma Street due to various noise complaints with the larger buses. Route N8 mostly operated along Veazey Sreet, Van Ness Street, Yuma Street, Massachusetts Avenue, New Mexico Avenue, and Nebraska Avenue. The route also replaced routes H2, H3 and H4 routing to Westmoreland Circle along Yuma Street with H2 terminating at Van Ness and H3, H4 at Tenleytown–AU station. The route mostly connects Wesley Heights residents and American University students to various destinations without having to transfer buses or take the train. The N8 mostly utilized the Orion IIs and 30 ft Orion Vs out of Western division due to its low demand route.

2004 Service Changes
On December 26, 2004, route N8 was extended to Glover Park via New Mexico Avenue in order to link residents to American University and Spring Valley.

2006 Proposed Changes
In 2006, WMATA proposed to eliminate weekend service on the N8 due to low ridership. According to WMATA's performance measures, ridership on the route continued to be low averaging 123 passengers on 19 trips Saturday and 117 on 17 trips on Sunday. Performance measures goes as the following:

2006 Service Changes
On September 24, 2006, weekend service for route N8 was discontinued. Weekday service and its current routing remained unaffected.

2010 Proposed Changes
In 2010, it was proposed to eliminate the N8 due to low ridership. The Van Ness–UDC station and Tenleytown–AU station section will be replaced by an rerouted route H2. Alternative service will be provided on the D1, D2, and N2, N4, N6. There will be no alternative service along Yuma Street or  New Mexico Avenue and Tunlaw Road between Cathedral Avenue and Edmunds Street however.

2010 Service Change
On December 19, 2010 route N8 was shorten to terminate at Tenleytown–AU station with service to Van Ness–UDC station replaced by an extended route H2. The line was also renamed into the Tenleytown–Glover Park Line as a result of the changes. Trips after 7:50 PM were also discontinued due to low ridership.

Proposed Discontinuation
In 2011, WMATA proposed to eliminate the N8 once in for all due to low ridership and not meeting WMATA standards. Performance measures continue to drop below WMATA standards through the years.

Residents were opposed to the elimination of route N8 as it will cause inconvenience to their travel time.

Discontinuation of Route
On September 25, 2011, route N8 was officially discontinued due to low ridership. WMATA rerouted route N2 between Friendship Heights station and Ward Circle via Massachusetts Avenue and Western Avenue replacing sections of route N8.

References

N8
1999 establishments in Washington, D.C.
2012 disestablishments in Washington, D.C.